Hubert Girault (born 13 February 1957 in Saint-Maur-des-Fossés, France) is a Swiss chemist and is Emeritus Professor at the École Polytechnique Fédérale de Lausanne (1992-2022). He was the director of the Laboratoire d'Electrochimie Physique et Analytique, with expertise in electrochemistry at soft interfaces, Lab-on-a-Chip techniques, bio-analytical chemistry and mass-spectrometry, artificial water splitting, CO2 reduction, and redox flow batteries.

Professor Girault has authored more than 600 scientific publications, with more the 20,000 citations, and an h-index of 76. He has authored a textbook entitled "Electrochimie: Physique et Analytique", which is published in English as "Analytical and Physical Electrochemistry". Professor Girault is an inventor of more than 17 patents (including developing of ESTASI method of ionisation). In addition to his role as a professor at the EPFL, he is an adjunct professor at the Engineering Research Center of Innovative Scientific Instruments, Ministry of Education of China, Fudan University, Shanghai. He has served as a visiting professor at ENS Cachan (Paris, France), Fudan University (China), Kyoto University (Japan), Peking University (China), and Xiamen University (China). Since 2022, he is visiting professor at Polytechnique University Mohamed VI (UM6P).

He has been married to Jördis since 1984 and is the father of Jan-Torben born 1988 and Freya-Merret born 1990.

He is a member of: Carnot Foundation, Naval group advisory board, GreenGT scientific board

Early life
Hubert Girault was born in France in 1957 and spent his childhood in Sucy-en-Brie before moving to Barbizon near Fontainebleau.

Academic career
Hubert Girault earned his engineering diploma in chemical engineering from the Grenoble Institute of Technology in 1979. Three years after that, in 1982, he completed his PhD thesis, entitled "Interfacial studies using drop image-processing techniques", at the University of Southampton, England. From 1982 to 1985, he worked as a post-doctoral researcher at the University of Southampton, before becoming a lecturer in physical chemistry at the University of Edinburgh. In 1992, he became a professor of physical chemistry at the École Polytechnique Fédérale de Lausanne (EPFL), where he continues to teach today. He is also the founder and director of the Laboratoire d'Electrochimie Physique et Analytique. He has served twice as chairman of the Department of Chemistry, now called Institute of Chemical and Engineering Science (ISIC) for the periods 1995-1997 and 2004–2008. He has also served twice as head of the Chemistry Teaching Commission in charge of chemistry and chemical engineering education at EPFL, now called Section of Chemistry and Chemical Engineering for the period 1997–1999 and 2001–2004.

He was director of the Doctoral Program in Chemistry at the EPFL for the period 1999–2000. During the period 2011–2014, he was Dean of Bachelor & Master Studies at EPFL and has supervised a comprehensive teaching reform, with the definition of new curricula starting September 2013. These changes included the introduction of a new first year curriculum with two-thirds of common courses for all scientific and engineering sections, and of a new bachelor curriculum integrating more closely lecture courses, exercises and practical laboratories. He was involved in a major overhaul of the master programs and the introduction of MOOCs for specific courses. As Dean, he introduced measures to improve the quality control of education, in particular by setting up, for each section, an academic commission responsible for auditing yearly all the programs. He also chairs the different admission committees both at the bachelor and master levels.

During his career, he has supervised 70 PhD students and trained many postdoctoral fellows. 30 former PhDs and post-docs are now professors in Canada, China, Denmark, Finland, France, Ireland, Italy, Japan, Korea, Singapore, UK & USA. Education has been a major part of his activities, and his lecture notes have formed the basis of a textbook entitled: "Electrochimie Physique et Analytique" (now in the third edition); translated in English "Analytical and Physical Electrochemistry".

Prof. Hubert Girault always had an interest in scientific publishing. Between, 1996 and 2001, he was associate editor of Journal of Electroanalytical Chemistry, which at the time was one of the major reference journals in the field. He is also the vice-president of the Presses polytechniques et universitaires romandes. He has served on many editorial boards and has served as Associate Editor of Chemical Science (Royal Society of Chemistry) (2010-2018). Prof. Hubert Girault was Chairman of the Electrochemistry division at EUCHEMS (2008-2010), and was the Chairman of the annual meeting of the International Society of Electrochemistry, Lausanne 2014.

Commercial enterprises
Girault has been the founding co-director of five companies:
Dydropp (1982, dissolved 1986) active in the production of video digitizing units for surface tension measurements,
Ecosse Sensors (1990, now part of Inverness Medical Technologies, USA) active in the production of laser photo-ablated carbon electrodes for heavy metal detection,
DiagnoSwiss (1999-2012)  active in the production of fast immunoassay systems.
SENSaSION (2017) active in the field of bacteria detection and antibiotic susceptibility test (AST).
Hydrogène du Valais, active in developing hydrogen infrastructure

Recognition

Girault's work has been cited more than 20,000 times, giving him an h-index of 76 according to Web of Science (or 29,000 and 92, correspondingly according to Google Scholar).

In 2006, he was awarded the Faraday Medal by the Royal Society of Chemistry. The following year, he was named a Fellow of the International Society of Electrochemistry. He was subsequently named a Fellow of the Royal Society of Chemistry in 2009 and Fellow of the Electrochemical Society in 2019. He received the Visiting Professorship Award for the "111 Project" from the Chinese Ministry of Education from 2008 to 2011. In 2015, he was awarded the Reilley Award by the American Society of Electroanalytical Chemistry. In 2020, he received the Shikata International Medal of the Polarographic Society of Japan.

Current research activities

Alkaline water electrolysis

Redox flow batteries
Professor Girault is also among the inventors of the dual-circuit redox flow battery (Ref), which enables indirect water electrolysis using the electrolytes of conventional redox flow batteries. A small scale demonstrator of the concept has been built in Martigny, Switzerland. The Martigny site is also home to the EPFL Grid-to-mobility demonstrator (proposed by Girault), which is a hydrogen and battery-electric vehicle fueling station utilizing a vanadium redox flow battery to buffer the energy demands of the fueling station.

Electrochemistry in MS-analysis

Development of immunoassays and sensors

Electrochemistry at soft interfaces
Also Hubert Girault is interested in self-assembly of molecular species and nanoparticles at liquid-liquid interfaces and carrying out fundamental research on electrochemistry at soft interfaces.

Electromobilis
Electromobility demonstrator "Electromobilis" with redox-flow batteries, fast chargers (80 kW) and hydrogen production and delivery.

References

1957 births
Living people
People from Saint-Maur-des-Fossés
Swiss chemists
Academic staff of the École Polytechnique Fédérale de Lausanne
Grenoble Institute of Technology alumni
Alumni of the University of Southampton